Gustaf Adolf "Gösta" Boltenstern Jr. (15 May 1904 – 31 March 1995) was a Swedish officer and horse rider who competed at the 1932,  1948,  1952 and 1956 Summer Olympics.

Military career
Boltenstern was born on 15 May 1904 in Stockholm, Sweden, the son of Colonel Gustaf Adolf Boltenstern and his wife Amelie (née von Dardel). He was commissioned as an officer in 1925 and attended the Cavalry School in France in 1931. Boltenstern became ryttmästare in 1940. Boltenstern was teaching at the Army Riding School from 1942 to 1954 and was appointed Major in 1953. He was placed in the reserve in 1954 and was head of the Herrevad Abbey Remount Depot from 1954 to 1957 and served as Equerry at the Royal Majesty's court from 1957. In 1969, Boltenstern was appointed Crown Equerry.

Sports career

Boltenstern rode as a child and started competing in 1927, after which he, with the exception of 1931, when he was commanded to the Cavalry School in Saumur, France, every year participated in equestrian competitions in Sweden. His most successful horses were: FOX, Vitalis, Nalle-Puh ("Winnie the Pooh"). The foremost success was the victory in Jönköping in 1932 in a difficult dressage competition. During the Nordic Equestrian Competitions in Oslo in 1929, in Stockholm in 1930 and in Copenhagen, he won a prize in the dressage competition with Fox and Vitalis.

In 1932 he and his horse Ingo were part of the Swedish dressage team which won the silver medal in the team dressage, after finishing eighth in the individual dressage.

Sixteen years later he competed again at the Olympics and won the bronze medal with his horse Trumf in the 1948 individual dressage. The Swedish team won the gold medal in the team event, but was disqualified because one of its members was not a legitimate military officer.

In 1952 he won his gold medal with the Swedish team in the team competition, after finishing fourth with his horse Krest in the individual dressage. In 1956 he and his horse Krest won their second gold medal with the Swedish dressage team. In the individual dressage they finished seventh.

Personal life
In 1929, Boltenstern married Britt Floderus (born 1908), daughter of Colonel Ernst Floderus and Majken (née Själander). He was the father of Claes (born 1935).

Dates of rank
1925 – Second lieutenant
19?? – Lieutenant
1940 – Ryttmästare
1953 – Major

Awards and decoration
Boltenstern's awards:

Knight of the Order of the Sword
Commander of the Order of the Star of Africa
Commander of the Order of the White Elephant
Knight of the Order of the Dannebrog
H. M. The King's Medal
Swedish Military Sports Association's gold medal with wreath (Sveriges militära idrottsförbunds guldmedalj med krans)
Swedish equestrian sport badge of honor (Svensk ridsports hederstecken)

References

External links
profile

1904 births
1995 deaths
Swedish Army officers
Military personnel from Stockholm
Sportspeople from Stockholm
Swedish dressage riders
Olympic equestrians of Sweden
Swedish male equestrians
Equestrians at the 1932 Summer Olympics
Equestrians at the 1948 Summer Olympics
Equestrians at the 1952 Summer Olympics
Equestrians at the 1956 Summer Olympics
Olympic gold medalists for Sweden
Olympic silver medalists for Sweden
Olympic bronze medalists for Sweden
Olympic medalists in equestrian
Knights of the Order of the Sword
Knights of the Order of the Dannebrog
Medalists at the 1956 Summer Olympics
Medalists at the 1952 Summer Olympics
Medalists at the 1948 Summer Olympics
Medalists at the 1932 Summer Olympics